Gabashvili is a Georgian surname, formerly of nobility. It may refer to:

Besarion Gabashvili (Besiki), Georgian poet and diplomat
Ekaterine Gabashvili, Georgian female writer
Gigo Gabashvili, Georgian artist
Konstantine Gabashvili, Georgian politician and diplomat
Revaz Gabashvili, Georgian politician and historian
Teymuraz Gabashvili, Russian tennis player  
Vasily Gabashvili, Georgian general

Georgian-language surnames